The Philadelphia Eagles are a professional American football team based in Philadelphia. The Eagles compete in the National Football League (NFL) as a member club of the league's National Football Conference (NFC) East division. The team plays its home games at Lincoln Financial Field in the South Philadelphia Sports Complex.

The franchise was established in 1933 as a replacement for the bankrupt Frankford Yellow Jackets when a group led by Bert Bell secured the rights to an NFL franchise in Philadelphia. Since their formation, the Eagles have appeared in the playoffs 29 times, won 16 division titles (12 in the NFC East), appeared in four pre-merger NFL Championship Games, winning three of them (1948, 1949, and 1960), and appeared in four Super Bowls, winning Super Bowl LII at the end of the 2017 season.

Thirteen individuals affiliated with the Eagles have been inducted to the Pro Football Hall of Fame as of 2023: Chuck Bednarik, Bert Bell, Bob Brown, Harold Carmichael, Brian Dawkins, Sonny Jurgensen, Greasy Neale, Tommy McDonald, Pete Pihos, Norm Van Brocklin, Steve Van Buren, Dick Vermeil, and Reggie White.

The team has had an intense rivalry with the New York Giants. It was ranked by NFL Network as the number one rivalry of all time, Sports Illustrated ranks it as the fourth-best rivalry in the NFL, and according to ESPN, it is one of the fiercest and most well-known rivalries in the American football community. They have a bitter rivalry with the Dallas Cowboys, which has become more high-profile since the 1960s, and a historic rivalry with the Washington Commanders. Their rivalry with the Pittsburgh Steelers is another bitter rivalry known as the battle of Pennsylvania, roughly dating back to 1933. The team ranks among the best in the league in attendance and has sold out every game since the 1999 season.

The Eagles are owned by Jeffrey Lurie, who bought the team from previous owner Norman Braman for $195 million on May 6, 1994. In 2017, Forbes valued the club at $2.65 billion, ranking them 10th among NFL teams in value.

Franchise history

NFL in Philadelphia (1899–1931)

The Frankford Athletic Association was organized in May 1899 in the parlor of the Suburban Club. The cost of purchasing a share in the association was $10. However, there were also contributing memberships, ranging from $1 to $2.50, made available to the general public. The Association was a community-based non-profit organization of local residents and businesses. In keeping with its charter, which stated that "all profits shall be donated to charity", all of the team's excess income was donated to local charitable institutions. The original Frankford Athletic Association apparently disbanded prior to the 1909 football season. Several of the original players from the 1899 football team kept the team together, and they became known as Loyola Athletic Club. In keeping with Yellow Jackets tradition, they carried the "Frankford" name again in 1912, to become the Frankford Athletic Association.

In the early 1920s, the Frankford Athletic Association's Yellow Jackets gained the reputation as being one of the best independent football teams in the nation. In 1922, Frankford absorbed the Philadelphia City Champion team, the Union Quakers of Philadelphia. That year, Frankford captured the unofficial championship of Philadelphia. During the 1922 and 1923 seasons, the Yellow Jackets compiled a 6–2–1 record against teams from the National Football League. This led to the Association being granted an NFL franchise in 1924, thus becoming the Frankford Yellow Jackets. In spite of winning the NFL championship in 1926, midway through the 1931 season, the Yellow Jackets went bankrupt and were forced to cease operations.

Bell and Wray era (1933–1940) 

After more than a year of searching for a suitable replacement for the Yellow Jackets in the lucrative Philadelphia market, the National Football League granted an expansion franchise to an ownership group headed by Bert Bell and Lud Wray, who were also awarded the liquidated assets of the defunct Yellow Jackets organization. The Bell–Wray group had to pay an entry fee of $3,500 (or roughly $67,000 USD in inflation-adjusted 2022 dollars) and assumed a total debt of $11,000 the Yellow Jackets owed to three other NFL franchises. Drawing inspiration from the Blue Eagle logo of the National Recovery Administration (a centerpiece of President Franklin D. Roosevelt's New Deal policies), Bell and Wray named their new franchise the Philadelphia Eagles. While it could seem as if the Yellow Jackets simply rebranded as the Eagles, both the Eagles organization and NFL officially regard the brands as 2 separate entities because there was no Philadelphia NFL team for a season and a half. Almost no Yellow Jackets players were on the Eagles' first roster.

The Eagles, the Pittsburgh Steelers, and the now-defunct Cincinnati Reds joined the NFL as expansion teams. Wray became the Eagles' first head coach after being convinced by Bell, his former teammate at Penn, to take the position. The team originally planned to play their home games at Shibe Park, which was the home of the Philadelphia Athletics baseball club. When negotiations fell through, the team managed to make a deal with the Athletics' crosstown rival, the Philadelphia Phillies, to play at the Baker Bowl.

The Eagles played their first game on October 15, 1933, against the New York Giants at the Polo Grounds in New York City; they lost, 56–0. The Eagles struggled over the course of their first decade, never winning more than four games. Their best finish was in their second season, 1934, when they tied for third in the East. For the most part, the Eagles' early rosters consisted of former Penn, Temple, and Villanova players who played for a few years before going on to other things.

In 1935, Bell proposed an annual college draft to equalize talent across the league. The draft was a revolutionary concept in professional sports. Having teams select players in inverse order of their finish in the standings, a practice still followed today, strove to increase fan interest by guaranteeing that even the worst teams would have the opportunity for annual infusions of the best college talent. Between 1927 (when the NFL changed from a sprawling Midwestern-based association to a narrower, major-market league) and 1934, a triopoly of three teams (the Chicago Bears, New York Giants, and Green Bay Packers) had won all but one title (the exception being the Providence Steam Roller of 1928). By 1936 the club had suffered significant financial losses and was sold through a public auction. Bert Bell was the only bidder and became the sole owner of the team. Wray refused a reduction in his salary and left the team. Bell assumed the head coaching position and led the team to a record of 1–11, for last place in the league.

From 1936 to 1939, the Eagles played at Municipal Stadium in South Philadelphia. In 1940, Bell balked at a 66% rent increase plus 10% of the gate receipts proposed by the city for using the stadium and signed a lease for Shibe Park (renamed Connie Mack Stadium in 1954). The Eagles would also be able to play night games as Shibe Park had installed lights the year before. In the 1941 season, the Eagles played their home opener at Municipal Stadium, but then moved to Shibe Park. To accommodate football at Shibe Park during the winter, management set up stands in right field, parallel to 20th Street. Some 20 feet high, these east stands had 22 rows of seats. The goalposts stood along the first base line and in left field. The uncovered east stands enlarged the park's capacity to over 39,000, but the Eagles rarely drew more than 25,000 to 30,000. The team finished the 1937 season 2–8–1 and would continue to struggle over the next three seasons.

Thompson, Wolman and the Happy Hundred era (1941–1969)

In December 1940, Bell intervened to stop the sale of Art Rooney's Steelers to Alexis Thompson, and then Rooney acquired half of Bell's interest in the Eagles. In a series of events known as the Pennsylvania Polka, Rooney and Bell exchanged their entire Eagles roster and their territorial rights in Philadelphia to Thompson for his entire Steelers roster and his rights in Pittsburgh. Ostensibly, Rooney had provided assistance to Bell by rewarding him with a 20% commission on the sale of the Steelers. Bell became the Steelers' head coach and Rooney became general manager.

Greasy Neale years (1941–1950) 

After assuming ownership, Thompson promptly hired Earle "Greasy" Neale as the team's head coach. During the first years under Neale, the team continued to struggle and finished the 1941 season with a 2–8–1 record. The 1942 season showed no improvement as the team went 2–9.

Steagles (1943)

In 1943, when manpower shortages stemming from World War II made it impossible to fill the roster, the team merged with the Steelers forming the "Phil-Pitt Eagles", known as the Steagles. Greasy Neale coached the team along with Steelers head coach Walt Kiesling. The team finished the season with a 5–4–1 record. The merger, never intended as a permanent arrangement, was dissolved at the end of the season.

In 1944, led by head coach Greasy Neale and running back Steve Van Buren, the Eagles had their first winning season in team history. After two more second-place finishes in 1945 and 1946, the team reached the NFL Championship game for the first time in 1947. Van Buren, Pete Pihos, and Bosh Pritchard fought valiantly, but the young team fell to the Chicago Cardinals, 28–21 at Chicago's Comiskey Park.

NFL champions (1948) 

Undeterred, the young squad rebounded in 1948 to return to the NFL Championship game. With home-field advantage (and a blinding snowstorm) on their side, the Eagles won their first NFL Championship against the Chicago Cardinals, by a score of 7–0. The only score came in the fourth quarter when Steve Van Buren ran for a 5-yard touchdown. Because of the severe weather, few fans witnessed the joyous occasion.

Before the start of the 1949 season, the team was sold by Thompson to a syndicate of 100 buyers, known as the "Happy Hundred", each of whom paid $3,000 for a share of the team. While the leader of the "Happy Hundred" was noted Philadelphia businessman James P. Clark, one unsung investor was Leonard Tose, a name that would eventually become very familiar to Eagles fans.

NFL champions (1949) 
The team returned to the NFL Championship game for the third consecutive year. The Eagles were favored by a touchdown, and won 14–0 for their second consecutive title-game shutout. Running back Steve Van Buren rushed for 196 yards on 31 carries for the Eagles, and their defense held the Rams to just 21 yards on the ground. Chuck Bednarik was selected as the first overall pick in the 1949 NFL Draft. An All-American lineman/linebacker from the University of Pennsylvania, Bednarik would go on to become one of the greatest and most beloved players in Eagles history.

With the new decade came another turn in team fortunes. In 1950, the Eagles opened the season against AAFC champion Cleveland Browns, who (along with two other AAFC franchises) had just joined the NFL. The Eagles were expected to make short work of the Browns, who at the time were widely considered the dominant team in a lesser league. However, the Browns lit up the Eagles' vaunted defense for 487 total yards, including 246 passing yards, in a 35–10 rout. The Eagles never really recovered, and finished 6–6.

Greasy Neale retired after the 1950 season and was replaced by Bo McMillin. Two games into the 1951 season, McMillin was forced to retire due to terminal stomach cancer. Wayne Millner finished out the season before being replaced by Jim Trimble.

While the remnants of the great 1940s teams managed to stay competitive for the first few years of the decade, and while younger players like Bobby Walston and Sonny Jurgensen occasionally provided infusions of talent, the team lacked the stuff of true greatness for most of the 1950s.

After the 1957 season, the Eagles moved from Connie Mack Stadium to Franklin Field at the University of Pennsylvania. Franklin Field would seat over 60,000 for the Eagles, whereas Connie Mack had a capacity of 39,000. The field's grass was replaced by AstroTurf in 1969, making it the first NFL stadium to use artificial turf.

Buck Shaw years (1958–1960) 

In 1958, the franchise took key steps to improve, hiring Buck Shaw as head coach and acquiring quarterback Norm Van Brocklin in a trade with the Los Angeles Rams. During the 1959 season, the team showed flashes of talent, and finished in second place in the Eastern Division. Former Eagles owner and co-founder Bert Bell, who at the time was the commissioner of the NFL, attended a game on October 11 at Franklin Field, when the Eagles faced the Pittsburgh Steelers, a team whom Bell also used to own. Bell refused the box seats that the Eagles had reserved for him and purchased his own tickets to sit with the fans. During the fourth quarter while sitting behind the end zone, he suffered a heart attack and died later that day.

NFL champions (1960) 

1960 remains one of the most celebrated year in Eagles history. Shaw, Van Brocklin, and Bednarik, each in their last season before retirement, led a team more notable for its grit than its talent. One observer later quipped that the team had "nothing but a championship" to its first division title since 1949. The team was aided by their two Pro Bowl receivers, wide receiver Tommy McDonald, who would later pen a short autobiography titled They Pay Me to Catch Footballs and tight end Pete Retzlaff.

On November 20, 1960, at Yankee Stadium in The Bronx, Bednarik launched a tackle against New York Giants' running back Frank Gifford, which has come to be known as The Hit, that is routinely ranked as one of the hardest and most vicious hits in NFL history. With the game tied 10 to 10 in the fourth quarter, Gifford caught a short pass over the middle and was immediately hit by Bednarik with a clothes line tackle so hard that it dropped Gifford to the ground unconscious. Gifford was removed from the field on stretcher and transported to a local hospital by ambulance, where he remained for ten days. Gifford was diagnosed with a deep concussion that resulted in his retirement from the game for 18 months. On the 100th anniversary of the NFL's founding, the NFL ranked Bednarik's tackle the 44th greatest play in league history. On December 26, 1960, one of the coldest days in recorded Philadelphia history, the Eagles faced Vince Lombardi's Green Bay Packers in the NFL Championship game and dealt the formidable Lombardi the sole championship game loss of his storied career. Bednarik lined up at center on offense and at linebacker on defense. Fittingly, the game ended as Bednarik tackled a struggling Jim Taylor and refused to allow him to stand until the last seconds had ticked away.

Van Brocklin had come to Philadelphia and agreed to play through 1960 with the tacit understanding that, upon his retirement as a player, he would succeed Shaw as head coach. Ownership, however, opted to promote assistant coach Nick Skorich instead, and Van Brocklin quit the organization in a fit of pique, instead becoming head coach of the expansion Minnesota Vikings. Back-up quarterback Sonny Jurgensen became the Eagles' starter for the 1961 season; they finished a half-game behind the New York Giants for first place in the Eastern Conference standings with a 10–4 record. Despite the on-the-field success, however, the franchise was in turmoil.

The 1962 team, decimated by injury, managed only three wins and were embarrassed at home in a 49–0 loss to the Packers. The off-field chaos continued through 1963, as the 65 shareholders remaining from the original Happy Hundred sold the team to Jerry Wolman, a 36-year-old millionaire Washington developer who outbid local bidders for the team, paying an unprecedented $5.505 million for control of the club.

In 1964, Wolman hired former Cardinals and Washington Redskins coach Joe Kuharich to a fifteen-year contract. Over the next five seasons the team failed to make the playoffs and the failures of the team over this period were highlighted by the Santa Claus incident, when fans pelted a Santa Claus with snowballs during a halftime Christmas pageant. The team had only one winning season, in 1966, finishing second in the NFL Eastern Conference. The Eagles lost to the Baltimore Colts 20–14, in the post season third-place game, the Playoff Bowl, which was held at the Orange Bowl in Miami. The Eagles finished 6–7–1 in 1967 and the following season fell further in the standings, going 2–12 in 1968.

Leonard Tose era (1969–1984) 

In 1969, Leonard Tose bought the team from Wolman for $16.155 million (equal to $ today), a new record for a professional sports franchise. Tose's first official act was to fire Coach Joe Kuharich after a disappointing 24–41–1 record during his five-year reign. He followed this by naming former Eagles receiving great Pete Retzlaff as General Manager and Jerry Williams as coach.

The Eagles' heated rivalry with the Giants is the oldest of the NFC East rivalries, dating back to 1933, and is often cited as one of the best rivalries in the NFL. 1970 was also the last season for the Eagles at Franklin Field; the team finished the first post-merger season in last place in their division at 3–10–1.

In 1971, the Eagles moved to the new Veterans Stadium. In its first season, the Vet was widely acclaimed as a triumph of ultra-modern sports engineering, a consensus that was short-lived, as was Williams' tenure as head coach. After a 3–10–1 record in 1970 and three consecutive blowout losses to Cincinnati, Dallas, and San Francisco to open the  season, Williams was fired and replaced by assistant coach Ed Khayat, a defensive lineman on the Eagles' 1960 NFL championship team. Williams and Khayat were hampered by Retzlaff's decision to trade longtime starting quarterback Norm Snead to the Minnesota Vikings in early 1971, to leave the team a choice between journeyman Pete Liske and the raw Rick Arrington. Khayat lost his first two games but won six of the season's last nine, thanks largely to the efforts of the defense, led by All-Pro safety Bill Bradley, who led the NFL in interceptions (11) and interception return yardage (248).

The team regressed in 1972 to finish 2–11–1, and Khayat was released. The two wins (both on the road) proved to be surprises, however. Philadelphia beat the Kansas City Chiefs (which had had the best record in the AFC a year before) 21–20 and the Houston Oilers 18–17 on six field goals by kicker Tom Dempsey. The latter game had been called the "Johnny Rodgers Bowl," because the loser, in finishing last in the league, would gain the first overall pick in the 1973 NFL Draft, which was then presumed to be Nebraska wingback Johnny Rodgers, the Heisman Trophy winner. With their loss, the Oilers got first pick and took University of Tampa defensive end John Matuszak, who later faced Philadelphia in Super Bowl XV. With the second overall pick, the Eagles selected USC tight end Charle Young.

Khayat was replaced by offensive guru Mike McCormack for the 1973 season. Aided by the skills of quarterback Roman Gabriel and towering young wide receiver Harold Carmichael, they managed to infuse a bit of vitality into a previously moribund offense.

New general manager Jim Murray also began to add talent on the defensive side of the line, most notably through the addition of future Pro Bowl linebacker Bill Bergey in 1974. Overall, however, the team was still mired in mediocrity. McCormack was fired after a 4–10 1975 season.

Dick Vermeil years (1976–1982) 

In , Dick Vermeil was hired from UCLA to coach the struggling Eagles, who had managed only one winning season from 1962 to 1975. Vermeil faced numerous obstacles as he attempted to rejuvenate a franchise that had not seriously contended in well over a decade. Despite the team's young talent and Gabriel's occasional flashes of brilliance, the Eagles finished 1976 with the same 4–10 record as in 1975. In 1977, the first seeds of hope began to emerge. The team obtained hard-throwing quarterback Ron Jaworski in a trade from the Los Angeles Rams in exchange for popular tight end Charle Young. The defense, led by Bergey and defensive coordinator Marion Campbell, began earning a reputation as one of the hardest-hitting in the league.

1978 saw one of the great moments in Eagles history, The Miracle at the Meadowlands, when Herman Edwards returned a fumble by Giants' quarterback Joe Pisarcik for a touchdown with 20 seconds left in the game, resulting in a 19–17 Eagles victory. The Eagles would edge into the playoffs with a 9–7 season. Young running back Wilbert Montgomery became the first Eagle since Steve Van Buren to exceed 1,000 yards in a season. In 1979, the Eagles tied for first place with an 11–5 record, as Montgomery shattered team rushing records with a total of 1,512 yards.

In 1980, the team dominated the NFC, facing its chief nemesis, the Dallas Cowboys, in the NFC Championship Game. The game was played in cold conditions before faithful fans at Veterans Stadium. Led by an outstanding rushing performance by Montgomery, whose long cutback TD run in the first half is one of the most memorable in Eagles history, and a gutsy game from fullback Leroy Harris, who scored the Eagles' only other TD that day, the Birds earned a berth in Super Bowl XV with a 20–7 victory.

The Eagles traveled to New Orleans for Super Bowl XV, where they were heavily favored over the Oakland Raiders, who had squeaked into the playoffs as a wild-card team. Things did not go the Eagles' way, beginning with Tose's imprudent decision to bring comedian Don Rickles into the pregame locker room to lighten the mood. Jaworski's first pass was intercepted by Rod Martin, setting up an Oakland touchdown. Later in the first quarter, a potential game-tying 40-yard touchdown pass to Rodney Parker was nullified by an illegal-motion penalty. The final score was 27–10. Journeyman quarterback Jim Plunkett was named the game's MVP.

The team got off to a promising start in the 1981 season by winning their first six games. They ended up 10–6 to earn a wild-card berth. However, their hopes to repeat as NFC champs were dashed in the wild-card round by the New York Giants, who won 27–21.

After the Eagles finished 3–6 in the strike-shortened 1982 season, Vermeil quit the team, citing "burnout".

Defensive coordinator Marion Campbell replaced Vermeil as head coach. Campbell had helped to popularize the "bend-don't-break" defensive strategy in the 1970s. Philadelphia struggled through the mid-1980s, marked by flagging fan participation. The team failed to make the playoffs in 1983 and 1984. The team nearly moved to Phoenix, Arizona at the end of the 1984 season.

Norman Braman era (1985–1993)

In 1985, Tose was forced to sell the Eagles to Norman Braman and Ed Leibowitz, highly successful automobile dealers from Florida, for a reported $65 million (equal to $ today) to pay off his more than $25 million ($ today) in gambling debts at Atlantic City casinos. The team again struggled during the 1985 season, and Campbell was fired after week 16, to be replaced by assistant head coach/defensive backs coach Fred Bruney for the season's last game.

In the 1985 Supplemental draft, the Eagles acquired the rights to the Memphis Showboats' elite pass rusher Reggie White.

Buddy Ryan years (1986–1990) 

In 1986, the arrival of head coach Buddy Ryan and his fiery attitude sparked team performance and ignited the fan base. Immediately infusing the team with his hard-as-nails attitude, the Eagles quickly became known for their tough defense and tougher attitudes. Ryan began rejuvenating the team by releasing several aging players, including Ron Jaworski. Randall Cunningham took his place and, despite a 5–10–1 season, began showing considerable promise. 1987 saw another strike, which shortened the season by one game. The substitutes who had filled in for the strikers performed poorly and were crushed 41–22 by the Dallas Cowboys. After the strike, the regular Eagles' 1987 team won a 37–20 revenge game against Dallas. The season record was 7–8, of which three games had been played by substitutes.

The Eagles reached the playoffs in 1988, but lost to the Chicago Bears, the team that Ryan had helped lead to a Super Bowl XX victory as defensive coordinator. The game became known as the "Fog Bowl", due to the inclement weather during the game. The Eagles lost, 20–12.

The following two years would see playoff appearances as well, but the team never made it past the first round. This failure was very frustrating to Eagles fans, as the team was widely regarded as among the most talented in the NFL. On offense, the Eagles were led by quarterback Cunningham, one of the most exciting players of his generation; tight end Keith Jackson; and running back Keith Byars. The defense is commonly acknowledged as among the greatest in league history, and as the best to never win a championship.

The two 1989 matches with Dallas were known as the Bounty Bowls. Both were won easily by the Eagles (the Cowboys finished 1–15 that year), and were marked by Ryan insulting new Cowboys coach Jimmy Johnson by placing a bounty on their kicker, and by Eagles fans throwing snowballs at him at Veterans Stadium. On November 12, 1990, during a Monday Night Football game at the Vet, the Eagles defeated the Washington Redskins by a score of 28–14, as the defense scored three of the team's four touchdowns. This game, more lopsided than its score would indicate, was subsequently labeled the Body Bag Game in reference to the number of injuries Eagles players inflicted on the Redskins and the physically tough play of the Eagles in the game. In the game, the Eagles knocked out the starting Washington quarterback, and then seriously injured his replacement. Running back Brian Mitchell, who would later be signed by the Eagles, was called upon to finish the game as the Redskins' quarterback. Washington returned to Philadelphia in the first round of the playoffs to defeat the Eagles 20–6, ending their season.

Ryan was fired on January 7, 1991 and was replaced by offensive coordinator Rich Kotite. The team started the 1991 season with the loss of starting quarterback Randall Cunningham due to a knee injury. Backup quarterback Jim McMahon assumed the starting role for the rest of the season. Despite having the top-rated defense in the league, the team failed to make the playoffs by finishing third in the NFC East with a record of 10–6.

On June 25, 1992, All Pro defensive tackle Jerome Brown was killed in an automobile accident. The team and fan base dedicated the 1992 season to "bring it home for Jerome". The team finished second in the NFC East with an 11–5 record to earn a wild-card playoff spot. Kotite led the Eagles to a victory over the New Orleans Saints in the wild-card game but then fell to the Dallas Cowboys in the Divisional round. Another blow to the team was the loss of all-time sacks leader Reggie White to free agency in the off-season.

Among the team's offensive stars during that period were quarterback Randall Cunningham, tight end Keith Jackson, and running back Herschel Walker. But what was known as the Gang Green defense, led by Reggie White, Jerome Brown, Clyde Simmons, Seth Joyner, Wes Hopkins, Mike Golic, Byron Evans, Eric Allen, Andre Waters, and Mark McMillian, defined the team. In 1993, Kotite's Eagles would fall apart after a promising start and miss the playoffs, ending the regular season 8–8.

Jeffrey Lurie era (1994–present) 

By 1994, team owner Norman Braman had become largely unpopular among local fans and a polarizing presence in the front office. Jeffrey Lurie bought the Eagles on May 6, 1994, for an estimated $185 million. The club is now estimated to be the 21st most valuable sports team, worth $3.4 billion, as evaluated in 2021 by Forbes.

In Lurie's first season as owner in 1994, the team went 7–9 and again missed the playoffs. Rich Kotite was fired and replaced by San Francisco 49ers defensive coordinator Ray Rhodes, who successfully lured 49ers star Ricky Watters to join the team as a free agent.

In 1995, Rhodes's first season, the Eagles got off to a slow start by losing three of their first four games but subsequently rebounded to finish with a 10–6 record and a playoff spot. In the Wild Card Round, the Eagles, playing at home, overwhelmed the Detroit Lions 58–37, with 31 of Philadelphia's points coming in the second quarter. However, the Eagles were again eliminated in the next round by the Cowboys by a score of 30–11. This would be Randall Cunningham's last game as an Eagle. Cunningham scored the only touchdown of the game and the last Eagles postseason touchdown for six years.

1995 marked the end of Cunningham's tenure as starting quarterback. Rhodes benched Cunningham in favor of Rodney Peete, leading to friction between the two. Earlier, rumors had circulated that Lurie and Rhodes had tried to trade Cunningham to the Arizona Cardinals. However, no such trade materialized and Cunningham retired shortly after the season.

In 1996, the Eagles' uniform colors were changed from the classic kelly green to a darker midnight green. The team got off to a good start, winning three of their first four games. However, a week-5 Monday night game at Veterans Stadium against the rival Cowboys witnessed a season-ending knee injury to Peete, loss of the team's momentum, and the transition to an offense led by Ty Detmer and Watters. While Detmer played well and Watters rushed for 1,411 yards, the season conformed to what had become a familiar pattern: 10–6 record and early elimination (a 14–0 shutout by the 49ers) in the playoffs. In the 1996 NFL draft, future fan-favorite and hall-of-famer Brian Dawkins was chosen in the 2nd round. The continued early playoff exits led fans and local media to cast blame on high-priced free agents (Irving Fryar, Watters, Troy Vincent, and Guy McIntyre) for not stepping up in big games, especially in the postseason. Rhodes gradually deteriorated under the stress of the job, and players were beginning to grow tired of his brash demeanor and often autocratic coaching style.

After a see-saw 6–9–1 campaign in 1997, the bottom fell out in 1998. The Eagles suffered a 3–13 record, their worst since 1972, and were ranked dead last in numerous offensive statistics. Home attendance was declining, a quarterback controversy was deteriorating an already rudderless locker room, and the players had all but tuned out the embattled coaching staff. Left with little choice after a disastrous season, fan revolt, and sagging team morale, Lurie fired Rhodes and hired Green Bay Packers quarterback coach Andy Reid as head coach.

Andy Reid years (1999–2012) 

The Eagles reemerged as a predominant NFL team under the leadership of new head coach Andy Reid, who was hired away from the Green Bay Packers, where he was the Packers' quarterback coach. Reid's first notable step was drafting Syracuse auarterback Donovan McNabb with the second overall pick in the 1999 NFL Draft. The Eagles' awful 1998 season would have entitled the Eagle to first pick but it was awarded to the rebooted Cleveland Browns. Despite clearing the roster for new talent by releasing unpopular and aging veterans such as Ricky Watters and Irving Fryar, Reid was still a virtual unknown before his arrival as head coach, and his appointment was met initially with skepticism among Philadelphia fans. The drafting of McNabb was unpopular with many Eagles fans, many of whom traveled to Madison Square Garden for the 1998 Draft and booed the selection, believing the Eagles instead should have selected Ricky Williams, a University of Texas running back who had been named the 1998 AP College Player of the Year.

The 1999 season was largely a rebuilding year for the Eagles, who won only five games. The team, which routinely sells out its home games in Philadelphia, had two 1999 home games that failed to sell out, resulting in local TV blackouts. Another six home games in the 1999 season sold out only because several local small business owners bought the remaining unsold tickets to spare Philadelphia-area viewers a television blackout of the game. 

The Week 5 home game at Veterans Stadium on October 10, 1999 against the Dallas Cowboys represented the last play of Cowboys wide receiver Michael Irvin's career. In the game, Irvin was driven into the turf by Eagles safety Tim Hauck, which left Irvin lying motionless. Some Eagles fans responded with applause, giving further rise to Philadelphia's reputation as unduly aggressive and hostile fans. Irvin was transported from the field by stretcher and then by ambulance to Thomas Jefferson University Hospital. Irvin, who was diagnosed with a potentially threatening cervical spine injury and forced to announce his NFL retirement after the injury, later said the Philadelphia fans were applauding his departure rather than his serious injury. The team finished the season with a record of 5–11.

The 2000 regular-season opener in Dallas on September 3 became known in NFL lore as the "Pickle Juice Game". Kickoff temperature in Texas Stadium was 109 degrees Fahrenheit and soared to nearly 120, making it the hottest game in league history, beating a previous record set in a 1997 Cowboys–Cardinals match in Arizona. The nickname came about because an Eagles trainer had prepared for the predicted heat by having the players drink the juice from jars of dill pickles in order to retain body moisture and stave off cramps and heat exhaustion. The experiment proved successful as the Eagles won 44–14 while multiple Cowboys players had been consigned to the bench, unable to handle the torrid climate while the Eagles had no players benched. The game was also significant as marking the beginning of Philadelphia's domination of the NFC East. The team finished the season at 11–5, reaching the playoffs as a wild card, which restored fan optimism. After brushing aside the Tampa Bay Buccaneers 21–3, the Eagles moved to the second round of the playoffs, only to lose 20–10 to the New York Giants. After compiling an 11–5 record in 2001, the Eagles reached the playoffs again, this time at the top of their division. In a near rerun of the previous year, they disposed of the Buccaneers in a 31–9 game. In the second round, the Eagles defeated the Bears 33–19 at Soldier Field. In the NFC Championship game, they were unable to stop the St. Louis Rams, who defeated them 29–24.

Despite injuries, McNabb led the Eagles to a 12–4 season in 2002. Once again, they reached the NFC Championship game, but lost at home 27–10 to the eventual Super Bowl champion Tampa Bay Buccaneers in the last game at Veterans Stadium.

In the opening game of the 2003 season, the Eagles were shut out 17–0 by the Tampa Bay Buccaneers in the first regular-season game ever played at their new home, Lincoln Financial Field. Once again, the team went 12–4 for the season and then reached the conference championship game. In doing so, the Eagles became the first team in modern history to get that far in the postseason after having been shut out at home in its first game. They achieved that distinction despite getting only five touchdown receptions all year by their wide receivers, which tied the league-low since the regular-season schedule was lengthened to its present 16 games in 1978 (this record would be broken in 2004 when the New York Giants' wide receivers caught only two touchdown passes). The Eagle receivers went through both September and October without a TD catch; the last time an NFL team had done that was in 1945. In the Divisional Round of the playoffs, the Eagles beat the Green Bay Packers 20–17 in overtime thanks in part to a late-game completion from McNabb to Freddie Mitchell on an iconic play that has come to be known as 4th and 26. They lost the NFC Championship game to the Carolina Panthers 14–3. Panthers cornerback Ricky Manning Jr. had three interceptions in the game.

The Eagles actively pursued premier wide receiver Terrell Owens, and acquired him in a controversial three-way deal with the Baltimore Ravens and the San Francisco 49ers, on March 16, 2004. The 2004 season began with a bang as Owens caught three touchdown passes from McNabb in their season opener against the New York Giants. Owens ended up with exactly 1,200 receiving yards and 14 touchdown receptions, although his season ended prematurely with an ankle injury in a December 19 game against the Dallas Cowboys. The Eagles' 12–7 victory in this game gave them home-field advantage throughout the conference playoffs for the third year in a row. The Eagles tied a record by clinching the NFC East division crown (their fourth straight) after only their eleventh game of the season, matching the mark set by the 1985 Chicago Bears and the 1997 San Francisco 49ers. Their final two regular-season games thus rendered meaningless, the Eagles sat out most of their first-string players in these games and lost both, yet still finished the season with a 13–3 record. McNabb had his best season to date, passing for 3,875 yards and 31 touchdowns, with only eight interceptions. This made him the first quarterback in NFL history to throw 30 or more TD passes and fewer than 10 interceptions in a single regular season. They then began their playoff run with the Divisional round at home against the sixth-seeded Minnesota Vikings. The Eagles led from the start and never looked back, as McNabb led a very efficient passing attack (21 of 33 for 286 yards and 2 TDs), Brian Westbrook dominated on the ground with 70 rushing yards, and Freddie Mitchell performed very well on the receiving corps (5 receptions for 65 yards and a TD), as Philadelphia won 27–14, setting up their fourth-straight NFC Championship appearance. Facing the Atlanta Falcons, McNabb threw for 180 yards and two touchdowns, while also rushing for 32 yards. Westbrook rushed for 96 yards and caught five passes for 39. Winning the game 27–10, the Eagles advanced to Super Bowl XXXIX, where they faced the New England Patriots. Although McNabb threw 3 touchdown passes and 357 yards in the game, and the score was tied 14–14 going into the fourth quarter, the Patriots outscored the Eagles with ten straight points. McNabb completed a 30-yard touchdown pass, and the Eagles defense held the Patriots to a 3 and out, but a crucial interception with 46 seconds left sealed their fate, as the Patriots won 24–21.

The team took a step back in 2005 with a 6–10 record, failing to make the playoffs for the first time since the 1999 season. McNabb had played with a sports hernia and a broken thumb, starting 4–2 then losing three in a row, before he finally succumbed to injury and missed the rest of the season. For obnoxious behavior and a feud with McNabb, Owens was suspended after 7 games and was eventually cut.

In 2006, the team lost McNabb 10 games in and went into turmoil. However, Westbrook stepped up, and the Eagles earned their fifth NFC East title under coach Reid, with a 10–6 record. They won the Wild Card game against the New York Giants, but lost in the Divisional Round to the New Orleans Saints. The 2007 season would end with the Eagles finishing 8–8 and failing to make the playoffs for the second time in three seasons. However in 2008, the team finished the season with a 9-6-1 record, making the playoffs with a wild card berth, The team upset the Minnesota Vikings in the first round, winning the game 26-14. The team then went on to defeat the defending Super Bowl champion New York Giants 23–11 en route to their sixth NFC Championship Game. In the NFC Championship game, the Eagles rallied from down 24–6 at halftime to up 25–24 in the fourth quarter, but they lost to the Arizona Cardinals by a score of 32–25 after quarterback Kurt Warner scored a touchdown with just under three minutes remaining in regulation.

Entering the 2009 season, the Eagles signed quarterback Michael Vick. On December 6, 2009, Andy Reid became only the fifth coach in NFL history to win 100 or more games with a single team in a single decade (the other four are Tom Landry, Don Shula, Tony Dungy, and Bill Belichick. McNabb finally had a complete receiving corps, between first-round draft pick Jeremy Maclin, DeSean Jackson's 1,000-yard season, and Brent Celek ranking among the top 5 tight ends in the league. Without Brian Dawkins, defensive end Trent Cole stepped up and became the dominant force on defense with 12 sacks, earning him his second trip to the Pro Bowl and All-Pro honors. In 2009, the Eagles started 5–4, then won six straight. After a shutout by the Dallas Cowboys in week 17, the Eagles failed to secure a first-round bye, and with a record of 11–5, they were the NFC's sixth seed. In their January 2010 wild card game, the Eagles played against their divisional foes for the second consecutive week, losing 34–14 to hand Dallas their first playoff win since December 1996.

On January 11, 2010, General Manager Tom Heckert, Jr. was hired away by the Cleveland Browns; he was replaced by Howie Roseman, who was promoted from Vice President of Player Personnel. On March 5, 2010, Brian Westbrook was cut from the Eagles after eight seasons with the team. On April 4, 2010, the team traded long-time starting quarterback Donovan McNabb to the Washington Redskins in exchange for a second-round draft pick. Kevin Kolb was immediately named the starter for the 2010 season, but after suffering a concussion in week 1 against the Packers, Vick took over as the starter. Week 4 saw the return of McNabb to Philadelphia. The Redskins got a touchdown early in the first quarter. After that, both offenses sputtered and the Eagles had to settle for two field goals. But things rapidly fell apart when Vick injured his ribs and chest late in the first quarter when two Redskins defensive backs crushed him from both sides while running near the end zone. Kolb was once again brought out to play, but delivered an uninspiring performance. He managed a touchdown pass in the fourth quarter, but it wasn't enough. A two-point conversion attempt after the touchdown failed, and Washington won 16–12. In Week 15, the Eagles beat New York in a stunning upset by overcoming a 21-point deficit in the second half. In the closing seconds of the game, DeSean Jackson returned a punt 65 yards for a touchdown to win 38–31. This became known as the Miracle at the New Meadowlands. Vick led the Eagles to their sixth NFC East division title in ten seasons. With a record of 10–6, the Eagles clinched the third seed. In the wild card round, the Eagles lost 21–16 to the eventual Super Bowl XLV champion Green Bay Packers.

The 2011 season for the Eagles was a major disappointment. The off-season was marred by a lockout that began in March after the NFL's collective bargaining agreement expired, making practices, trades, and free agency impossible. During the draft, the Eagles did comparatively little. After the lockout ended in July, the team embarked on a rash of high-profile FA signings, including Raiders CB Nnamdi Asomugha, Dolphins RB Ronnie Brown, Giants WR Steve Smith, Packers TE Donald Lee, Titans DE Jason Babin, and Packers DT Cullen Jenkins. Meanwhile, Kevin Kolb, displeased at losing the starting quarterback job to Michael Vick in 2010, was traded to Arizona for Dominique Rodgers-Cromartie. Replacing him as 2nd-stringer was ex-Titans quarterback Vince Young. Young created a lot of hype by calling Philadelphia the "Dream Team". The team managed to finish only 8–8 and missed the playoffs.

In 2012, the Eagles started off winning three of their first four games but lost their next eight, which eliminated them from the playoff hunt. They won only one of their last four games. After a loss to the New York Giants on December 30, 2012, head coach Andy Reid was fired after fourteen seasons with the team.

Chip Kelly years (2013–2015) 

On January 16, 2013, after a 4–12 season, the Eagles brought in University of Oregon head coach Chip Kelly to succeed Reid as head coach. The Philadelphia Eagles named Michael Vick the starting quarterback going into the 2013 season with much promise running Chip Kelly's fast-paced spread offense. The 2013 season proved very successful for the Eagles. While a hamstring injury took Michael Vick out after a 1–3 start, his backup Nick Foles led the team to a 10–6 regular-season record and its seventh NFC East title in 13 seasons. Before throwing his first interception in Week 14, Foles had thrown 19 touchdowns, just one shy of the all-time NFL record of consecutive touchdowns without an interception to start a season, set earlier in the season by Peyton Manning. Foles also tied Manning for most touchdown passes in a single game, with seven, against the Oakland Raiders, which also made him the youngest player in NFL history to throw for that many touchdowns in a game. Foles finished the regular season with 27 touchdown passes and only 2 interceptions, giving him the then-best TD-INT ratio in NFL history. (That record was later broken by Tom Brady, in the 2016 season.) He also finished with a 119.0 passer rating, third-highest in league history behind only Aaron Rodgers in 2011 and Peyton Manning in 2004. He was also only the second quarterback in NFL history to have a game in which he topped 400 passing yards and a perfect passer rating. LeSean McCoy finished his Pro Bowl season as the league's top rusher with 1,607 rushing yards (also a franchise record) and 2,146 total yards from scrimmage, also best in the NFL. As a whole, the Eagles offense scored 51 touchdowns, most in franchise history, passing the previous season-high set back in 1948. Following the 2013 season, the Eagles released Pro-Bowl wide receiver DeSean Jackson due to his poor "work ethic and attitude", as well as speculation of his involvement in gang-related activities. The team signed All Pro safety Malcolm Jenkins to a three-year contract, worth $16.25 million.

The Eagles opened the 2014 season winning their first three games and making NFL history as the only team ever to trail by ten or more points in their first three games and come back to win. Nick Foles struggled with turnovers, but ultimately did well and led the Eagles to a 6–2 record, before breaking his collarbone, resulting in his replacement by Mark Sanchez, who outplayed Foles. The Eagles held the divisional title from Week 1 to Week 15. After going 9–3 with a crucial win over Dallas, the Eagles lost their next three, and a week after losing the NFC East title, they lost an upset against the 3–11 Redskins and were eliminated from playoff contention with the Cowboys' win over the Indianapolis Colts.

Following the 2014 season, Chip Kelly was given total control and made some controversial personnel moves. He traded LeSean McCoy, who had become the team's all-time leading rusher after the 2014 season, for linebacker Kiko Alonso, a player Kelly coached at Oregon who had missed the entire 2014 season. He also cut ten-year veteran and starter Trent Cole, who was still a consistent threat on defense and was second only to legend Reggie White on the Eagles all-time sack list. He also traded the highly successful Nick Foles for Sam Bradford, who had missed the entire 2014 season with a torn anterior cruciate ligament. Kelly tried to re-sign Jeremy Maclin, who had stepped up as the team's leading wide receiver, but Maclin signed with the Kansas City Chiefs instead. However, the Eagles also acquired league leading rusher DeMarco Murray, which not only helped the Eagles, but hurt their rivals, the Dallas Cowboys. They also obtained Super Bowl champion Byron Maxwell, who left the Seattle Seahawks in free agency to sign a six-year, $63 million contract. The first two games of the 2015 season were dismal, as they lost both. Bradford had a poor 2–4 TD-INT ratio, Maxwell was constantly beaten by Falcons receiver Julio Jones, and Murray was held to 11 yards on 21 carries. After Murray was injured, Ryan Mathews rushed for over 100 yards in a Week 3 win against the New York Jets. Kelly made Murray the unquestioned starter and although Murray's play improved over the season, he never regained his dominant form and was held to a career-low average of 3.6 yards per carry.

On December 29, 2015, with one game left in the season, head coach Chip Kelly was released by the Eagles after a 6–9 record. Offensive coordinator Pat Shurmur was named interim head coach for the final game against the rival New York Giants, which Shurmur won 35–30.

Doug Pederson years (2016–2020) 

The Eagles hired Kansas City Chiefs' offensive coordinator Doug Pederson as their next head coach on January 18, 2016. Pederson had been with the Chiefs for the preceding three years after having spent the four seasons before those with the Eagles. He served as a quality control assistant coach for the Eagles in 2009 and 2010 before being promoted to quarterbacks coach for the 2011 and 2012 seasons. He had been praised for his work with Chiefs quarterback Alex Smith over the prior several seasons, particularly 2015, as the Chiefs moved into the top 10 in scoring offense.

At the end of the 2015 season, the Eagles were slated for the 13th overall pick in the 2016 NFL Draft. They traded that pick, Byron Maxwell, and Kiko Alonso to the Miami Dolphins for the eighth overall pick. Later, they traded the eighth overall pick, their third- and fourth-round picks, a 2017 first-round pick, and a 2018 second-round pick to the Cleveland Browns for the second overall pick and a 2017 fourth-round pick. They used the second overall pick to draft North Dakota State quarterback Carson Wentz. On September 3, 2016, the Eagles traded starting quarterback Sam Bradford to the Minnesota Vikings, who had lost Teddy Bridgewater for the season, for a 2017 first-round pick and a 2018 fourth-round pick. Following the trade, the Eagles named Wentz the starting quarterback for Week 1 of the 2016 season.

First-time head coach Pederson led the Eagles to a 3–0 record to start the season. His rookie quarterback started with five touchdowns, no interceptions and over 255 yards per game. After a Week 4 bye, they lost four out of the next five games, including losses to every team in their division. They also lost right tackle Lane Johnson to a 10-game suspension following the Week 5 loss against the Lions, which damaged Carson Wentz's hot start. In those four defeats, their average margin of loss was just under 5 points. Pederson and the Eagles won just three of their final seven games. Although Wentz started off the season well, he finished with a TD–INT ratio of 8:7. The rookie head coach-quarterback tandem led the Eagles to a 7–9 record, finishing last in the division.

Super Bowl LII champions (2017) 

The Eagles had a 13–3 record in 2017, including a nine-game winning streak. In a week 14 game against the Los Angeles Rams, starting quarterback Carson Wentz left the game with a torn anterior cruciate ligament, and backup Nick Foles, who had been re-signed in the off-season, took over for the rest of the season. Foles's first start was a comeback from a 20–7 deficit against the New York Giants where he scored four touchdowns to win 34–29. Foles struggled in the last two games of the season against the Oakland Raiders and the Dallas Cowboys and threw a touchdown and two interceptions in those two games. Despite this, the Eagles clinched home-field advantage after the win against Oakland in week 16. Foles led the Eagles past the Atlanta Falcons in the Divisional Round 15–10. In the NFC Championship game, the Eagles beat the Minnesota Vikings 38–7, despite having been betting underdogs. Foles had his best game since week 15 and threw for 352 passing yards and three touchdowns. The Eagles traveled to Minneapolis to compete in Super Bowl LII, their third attempt at a title, against Tom Brady and the New England Patriots in a rematch of Super Bowl XXXIX from 2005.

With Foles at the helm, the game's first touchdown was scored by the Eagles in just three plays: a short pass from Foles to Nelson Agholor, a 36-yard run up the middle by LeGarrette Blount, and a 34-yard touchdown pass from Foles to Alshon Jeffery on the left side of the field. The ensuing extra-point attempt from Elliott was missed wide right, which made the score 9–3 in favor of the Eagles. The Patriots responded by advancing the ball to the Philadelphia 11-yard line on their next drive, which was set up by a 50-yard completion from Brady to Danny Amendola, and the quarter ended.

In the second quarter, Philadelphia faced fourth-and-goal on the 1-yard line with 38 seconds left. Deciding to go for the touchdown, they attempted a trick play similar to one that had failed for the Patriots earlier. It would be the most memorable play of the game. As Foles stepped up to the running back position, Clement took a direct snap and pitched the ball to tight end Trey Burton, who then threw the ball to Foles, who was wide open in the right side of the end zone. Foles caught the ball, making him the first quarterback ever to catch a touchdown pass in a Super Bowl, and the ensuing extra point was good, giving the Eagles a 22–12 lead, which was taken into the locker room after a short drive by the Patriots. The scoring play came to be known as the Philly Special. New England's only lead was by one point in the fourth quarter, 33–32, but the Eagles rallied back and scored an 11-yard touchdown to tight end Zach Ertz to take the lead. The last score of the game was a 46-yard field goal by Jake Elliott to make the final score 41–33.

The Eagles won their first Super Bowl and Vince Lombardi Trophy in franchise history and their first championship since 1960, ending the third-longest active championship drought in the NFL at 57 years. Foles won Super Bowl MVP going 28 for 43 with 373 passing yards, three passing touchdowns, one interception, and one receiving touchdown. Foles became the first backup quarterback to start and win a Super Bowl since his opponent Tom Brady won as the backup for Drew Bledsoe in 2002's Super Bowl XXXVI.

The combined 74 points scored was one point shy of the Super Bowl record of 75, set in Super Bowl XXIX in 1995; this game marked only the second time in the history of the Super Bowl where the teams combined for 70+ points. The game also set a record for most yardage by both teams (combined) with 1,151 yards, the most for any single game, regular season or postseason.

The game set many other Super Bowl records as well, including fewest punts from both teams (one), most yards gained by a team (613 for New England) and most points scored by a losing team (33).

Before the 2018 season started, many injuries plagued the team, including quarterback Carson Wentz, who was still recovering from an anterior cruciate ligament injury that he had sustained during the previous season. Nick Foles was named the starting quarterback to begin the season, and helped the team win their opening game against the Atlanta Falcons, 18–12. Wentz returned as the starting quarterback in week 3 after Foles had led the team to a 1–1 record. Injuries continued to be a major problem throughout the season, especially on defense as Jalen Mills, Ronald Darby, and Rodney McLeod all suffered season-ending injuries. Wentz suffered a fractured vertebra in his back after a week 14 loss to the Dallas Cowboys, and Foles was again named the starter for remainder of the season. The Eagles' 4–6 record after 10 games seemed to give them little chance of making the playoffs, but the team managed to win 5 of their last 6, including upsets over the Los Angeles Rams and Houston Texans. The Eagles finished the season with a 9–7 record and made the playoffs as the sixth seed.

In the Wild Card game against the Chicago Bears, Foles threw 2 touchdowns and 2 interceptions in a 16–15 win. With ten seconds left, Bears kicker Cody Parkey missed a potential game-winning field goal that became known in NFL lore as the Double Doink. This sent the Philadelphia Eagles to an NFC Divisional matchup against the New Orleans Saints. The Eagles offense initially performed well, ending the first quarter with a 14–0 lead. The Eagles would not score again after the Saints defense rallied, forcing Foles to throw two interceptions. The Eagles ended up losing by a score of 20–14, ending their opportunity to repeat as Super Bowl champions.

In 2019, the Eagles matched their 9–7 record from 2018. They won 4 straight games against divisional opponents to close the season, clinching the NFC East in Week 17 with a 34–17 win over the New York Giants and clinched a playoff berth for the third consecutive season. Carson Wentz started his first playoff game in the Wild Card round against the Seattle Seahawks, but left the game early in the first quarter after suffering a concussion on a controversial helmet-to-helmet hit by Jadeveon Clowney. Backup quarterback Josh McCown finished the game even after suffering a torn hamstring in the second quarter. The Eagles lost to the Seahawks 17–9, ending their season.

The Eagles opened the 2020 season with consecutive losses to the Washington Football Team and Los Angeles Rams. In week 3, the Eagles tied with the Cincinnati Bengals after controversially punting the ball instead of attempting a potential 64-yard game-winning field goal late in overtime. The decision was widely criticized by sports media and fans as they accused head coach Doug Pederson of settling for a tie, rather than playing to win. Once again, injuries continued to plague the team as almost every offensive starter had suffered an injury throughout the season, and the team fielded 14 different offensive line combinations in 16 games. The team entered the bye week with a 3–4–1 record and proceeded to lose their next four games. During their week 13 match-up against the Green Bay Packers, rookie quarterback Jalen Hurts entered the game in the third quarter in relief of Wentz after poor play. Hurts would later be named the starting quarterback for the remainder of the season after a career-worst season performance by Wentz. Hurts led the Eagles to a 24–21 victory against the New Orleans Saints in week 14. This would be the team's last win of the 2020 season as they lost their next three games, finishing with a 4–11–1 record and missing the playoffs for the first time in four seasons.

During the 2020 off-season, defensive coordinator Jim Schwartz announced that he would step down from his position. A day later, linebackers coach Ken Flajole left his position on the team. After a disappointing 2020 season, Doug Pederson met with Eagles owner Jeffrey Lurie to discuss the future of the team. Pederson proposed changes to the coaching staff that were described by internal reporters as "underwhelming" and out of line with Lurie's vision for the team.

On January 11, 2021, the Eagles announced that they had fired Pederson. In a statement, Lurie described the move as in the best interests of both Pederson and the team. Pederson became just the first head coach to be fired within three years of winning a Super Bowl since the Baltimore Colts fired Don McCafferty after the 1972 NFL Season.

Nick Sirianni years (2021–present) 

The Eagles hired former Indianapolis Colts' offensive coordinator Nick Sirianni as their next head coach on January 21, 2021. During the offseason, the Eagles traded starting quarterback Carson Wentz to the Colts for a 2021 third-round draft pick and a 2022 conditional second-round pick. In doing so, Wentz was reunited with Frank Reich, head coach of the Colts who served as the Eagles' offensive coordinator for Wentz's first two years in Philadelphia, including during their Super Bowl–winning season in 2017. The Eagles absorbed a $33.8-million dead-cap hit for trading Wentz.

During the 2021 NFL Draft, the Eagles selected Heisman Trophy–winning wide receiver DeVonta Smith with the 10th overall pick, and maneuvered around the draft to gain an extra first-round selection in the 2022 NFL Draft. Smith was a highly touted prospect out of the University of Alabama, and was the first Heisman winner the Eagles drafted in over fifty years. The drafting of Smith also reunited him with Jalen Hurts, his first quarterback at Alabama.

After training camp, Hurts was officially named the Eagles' starting quarterback for the 2021 season by head coach Sirianni. After starting the season 2–5, the Eagles went 7–3 in their last ten games, clinching a playoff berth in week 17 after a victory over the Washington Football Team along with a loss by the Minnesota Vikings and win by the San Francisco 49ers. The Eagles finished the season with the #1 rushing offense; It was the best rushing offense since the 1985 Chicago Bears, and the best in the franchise history since the 1949 Eagles team. They lost in the wild card game against the Tampa Bay Buccaneers 31–15.

The Eagles went on to win their first eight games of the 2022 season, and earned the top seed in the NFC with a 14–3 overall record. They went on to beat the Giants 38–7 in the Divisional round, followed by a 31–7 victory over the San Francisco 49ers in the NFC Championship game, earning them their fourth Super Bowl appearance. However, despite erasing a late 8-point deficit, they ultimately lost on a late field goal to the Kansas City Chiefs, 38–35.

Championships

NFL championships (pre-Super Bowl era)

Super Bowl championships

NFC championships

Division championships 
The Eagles were a part of the NFL Eastern Division from 1933 to 1949, the National Conference from 1950 to 1953, and the Eastern Conference from 1953 to 1966. They were then placed in the Capitol Division of the Eastern Conference in 1967. When the league reformed into the NFC and AFC in 1970, the Eagles were placed in the NFC East.

Logo and uniforms

The choice of an eagle as the team mascot honored the insignia of the New Deal program, the National Recovery Administration, which featured a blue eagle as its insignia.

For the 1933 and 1934 seasons, the Eagles colors were light blue and yellow. In 1935, they added green to their uniforms and for several decades, their colors were kelly green, silver, and white. In 1954 the Eagles, along with the Baltimore Colts, became the second team ever in the NFL to put a logo on their helmets, with silver wings on a kelly green helmet. In 1969 the team wore two helmet versions: Kelly green with white wings in road games, and white with kelly green wings at home. From 1970 to '73, they wore the white helmets with Kelly green wings exclusively before switching back to Kelly green helmets with silver wings. By 1974, Joseph A. Scirrotto Jr. designed the silver wings within a white outline, and this style on a kelly green helmet became standard for over two decades.

From 1948 to 1995, the team logo was an eagle in flight carrying a football in its claws, although from 1969 to 1972, the eagle took on a more stylized look.

In 1973, the team's name was added below the eagle, returning to its pre-1969 look.

Both the logo and uniforms were radically altered in 1996, when the primary kelly green color was changed to a darker shade, officially described as "midnight green." Silver was practically abandoned, as uniform pants moved to either white or midnight green. The traditional helmet wings were changed to a primarily white color, with silver and black accents. The team's logo combination (the eagle and club name lettering) also changed, with the eagle itself limited to a white (bald eagle) head, drawn in a less realistic, more cartoon-like style, and the lettering changed from calligraphic to block letters. The eagle head is the only NFL logo to “face left” which causes the right side of the logo to present a stylized “E”.

Since 1996, the team has made only minor alterations, mostly related to jersey/pants combinations worn during specific games. For example, in 1997, against the San Francisco 49ers, the team wore midnight green jerseys and pants for the first of only two occasions in team history. The second occasion was in 2002, during the final regular season game at Veterans Stadium, a win over the division-rival Washington Redskins. A year later, in the first two games of the 2003 season (both home losses, to the Tampa Bay Buccaneers and New England Patriots), the Eagles wore white jerseys with white pants. After that, the white jerseys along with white pants were worn exclusively during preseason games from 2004 to 2011, with the exception of 2007 and 2010.

The 2003 season also saw the first (though subtle) change to the 1996-style uniform. On both white and green jerseys, black shadows and silver trim were added to both the green and white numbering. The stripe on the pants changed from black-green-black to black-silver-green on the white pants, and from a solid black stripe to one stripe of black, another of silver, with one small white stripe in between for the midnight green pants. The 2003 season also saw the team debut black alternate jerseys, with a green (instead of black) shadow on white numbers, and silver trim. These black jerseys have been worn for two selected home games each season (usually the first home game after a bye week and the season finale). In the 2003 and 2004 regular-season home finales, the team wore the green road pants with the black alternate jerseys, but lost both games. Since then, the Eagles have only worn the black jerseys with the white pants. However, due to the special 75th-anniversary uniforms serving as the "alternates" for one game in 2007, the Eagles could not wear the alternate black jersey that season per league rules at the time (alternate uniforms were permitted twice per season but only one can be used). The black jerseys with white pants, however, re-appeared for the 2008 Thanksgiving night game against the Arizona Cardinals. From 2006 to 2013, the Eagles have only worn the alternate black jerseys once a season and for the last November home game, but did not use them in 2007, 2010, and 2011. For the 2007 and 2010 seasons, the Eagles used throwback uniforms in place of the black alternates for their anniversary to commemorate past teams. The team also started wearing black cleats exclusively in 2004, although the rule was relaxed by the mid-2010s.

To celebrate the team's 75th anniversary, the 2007 uniforms featured a 75th-season logo patch on the left shoulder. In addition, the team wore "throwback" jerseys in a 2007 game against the Detroit Lions. The yellow and blue jerseys, the same colors found on Philadelphia's city flag, are based on those worn by the Philadelphia Eagles in the team's inaugural season, and had been the same colors used by the Frankford Yellow Jackets franchise prior to its suspension of operations in 1931. The Eagles beat Detroit, 56–21.

The Eagles wear their white jerseys at home for preseason games and daytime games in the first half of the regular season from September to mid-October when the temperature is warmer. In night contests in the first half of the regular season, the Eagles do not need to wear white at home since the temperature is cooler. However, there have been exceptions, such as the home opener against the Tampa Bay Buccaneers in 2003 and the Washington Redskins in 2007 that were played at night. In late October or beginning in November, the Eagles start to wear their colors at home (although they had done it earlier), be it the midnight green jerseys or a third jersey. On one occasion, the Eagles wore white at home after October in a meeting against the Dallas Cowboys on November 4, 2007, in order to make the Cowboys wear their blue road jerseys. Upon moving to Lincoln Financial Field in 2003, the Eagles wore white at home for at least their home opener, but in recent years they opted to wear their standard midnight green jerseys even during the warmest of autumn weather.

In the 2010 season against the Green Bay Packers, on September 12, 2010, the Eagles wore uniforms similar to the ones that were worn by the 1960 championship team in honor the 50th anniversary of that team. In weeks 4 and 6 of the 2010 season, the Eagles wore their white jerseys in a match-up against the Washington Redskins and Atlanta Falcons, respectively, before reverting to their midnight green jerseys for the rest of their home games.

For the 2012 season, Nike took over from Reebok as the NFL's official apparel licensee, but the Eagles decided that they would not be adopting Nike's "Elite 51" uniform technology. Aside from the Nike logo replacing the Reebok logo, the only other change is the league-wide revision of the NFL shield on the uniform (replacing the NFL Equipment logo). Other than that the uniforms essentially remain unchanged. The Eagles also revived their black alternate jersey and resumed wearing white pants with their white jerseys in the regular season.

For the 2014 season, the Eagles officially adopted the "Elite 51″ style uniform from Nike. However, they only broke out the midnight green jerseys and pants in the second half of that season due to the difficulty of producing their preferred shade of midnight green.

Recently the team has discussed bringing back the "Kelly Green" uniforms similar to the uniforms worn in the 1960 NFL Championship season, which were last worn in the 2010 season opener vs. Green Bay. Traditionally, kelly green, silver and white had been the official team colors, until the 1996 season when it changed to the current "Midnight Green" uniforms. NFL rules and restrictions require that teams go through a waiting period before any major uniform changes and alterations can be made, which means it would likely be quite some time before any uniform changes are officially made.

In Week 6 of 2014 against the New York Giants, the team introduced black pants to complement their black jerseys, giving them a blackout uniform set. The Eagles won the game 27–0. The victory was their first shutout in 18 years. In Week 16 of 2016 (also against the Giants), the Eagles wore a variation of the all-black look as part of the NFL Color Rush program, but with solid black socks as opposed to black with white sanitary socks of the original look. The black jerseys/white pants combination was last seen during a preseason road game against the New England Patriots, after which the black jerseys were paired exclusively with the black pants.

In 2018, the Eagles' midnight green pants were not worn at all, marking the first such instance since the 1996 rebrand that the Eagles wore only white pants with their primary white or midnight green jerseys.

In Week 6 of the 2017 season, the Eagles debuted an all-white look with white jerseys, white pants and solid white socks in a road game against the Carolina Panthers. The all-white look began to be utilized full-time as a road uniform set in 2019 thanks to the NFL's decision to allow teams to wear solid color socks as an alternate look.

During Week 10 of the 2021 season, the Eagles paired their white uniforms with the alternate black pants against the Denver Broncos, marking the first time the black pants were paired with a different colored uniform.

In 2022, the Eagles unveiled a new black alternate helmet, which would be worn alongside the all-black uniform. In addition, the team announced that throwback Kelly Green uniforms would return as an alternate uniform starting in the 2023 season. The team originally intended to release the uniforms in 2022, but due to production supply issues, the Eagles elected to delay its release to 2023, with the Kelly Green helmet most likely supplanting the black helmet barring any changes to the NFL's alternate helmet rule.

On June 16, It was released to the media that the Eagles would be changing their wordmark to a more modernized design. The new wordmark would replace the old design immediately however would not be placed on the Team’s Jerseys until the 2024 season.

Rivalries

Dallas Cowboys

The Eagles and Dallas Cowboys rivalry has been listed among the best and most acrimonious in the NFL. The Eagles won the first game in this rivalry 27–25 on September 30, 1960. Dallas leads the all-time series 69–54 as of the 2020 season, but in recent years, the series has been close, with each team winning 12 games since 2006. There is considerable hostility between the two teams' fan bases, with incidents such as the 1989 Bounty Bowl. The rivalry has even spilled over into Draft Weekend, with Cowboys legend Drew Pearson and Eagles legend David Akers exchanging insults at the opposing franchise in 2017 and 2018, respectively.

New York Giants

The Eagles' rivalry with the New York Giants began in 1933 with the founding of the Eagles and slowly strengthened when both teams came to relative prominence in the 1940s and 1950s. The two teams have played in the same division in the NFL every year since 1933. The ferocity of the rivalry can also be attributed to the geographic New York-Philadelphia rivalry, which is mirrored in Major League Baseball's Mets–Phillies rivalry and the NHL's Flyers–Rangers rivalry. It is ranked by NFL Network as one of the greatest rivalries of all time, Sports Illustrated ranks it as the fourth best NFL rivalry of all time, and according to ESPN, it is one of the fiercest and most well-known rivalries in the football community. The Eagles lead the all-time series 92–88–2 after the 2022 NFL season.

Washington Commanders

While not as big as the rivalries with the Giants and Cowboys, the Eagles' historical rivalry with the Washington Redskins and Washington Commanders has still been fierce. Although the two franchises played in the same division in the Eagles' inaugural 1933 season, their first meeting did not take place until October 21, 1934, during Washington's first year under the Boston Redskins moniker; the Redskins defeated the Eagles 6–0 at Fenway Park. Washington currently leads the all-time series 87–80–8. Since 2010, the rivalry has been very even overall with the Eagles winning 12 of the last 20 matchups.

Pittsburgh Steelers

The Eagles and Pittsburgh Steelers are both located in Pennsylvania and began play in 1933. From that season through 1966, this was a major rivalry for both teams, as both were part of the same division. In 1967 they were placed in separate divisions, but remained in the same conference for three years. In 1970 the Steelers (along with the Cleveland Browns and Baltimore Colts) moved to the American Football Conference, while the Eagles stayed with the rest of the old-line NFL teams in the National Football Conference. As a result, the Eagles and Steelers no longer played each other every year; instead, they are scheduled to meet once every four years in the regular season. The most recent meeting was in 2022 at Lincoln Financial Field due to the addition of a regular season game based on opposing conference divisional finish from the season before, with the Eagles winning 35-13. The Steelers have lost ten straight games on the road against the Eagles dating back to 1966, which was also the start of the Super Bowl era. The Eagles lead the all-time series 49–29–3.

Atlanta Falcons

The Eagles lead the Atlanta Falcons 21–15–1, with a 3–1 lead in playoff games. The rivalry first emerged after the Falcons upset the Eagles in the 1978 Wild Card Round, and only intensified further during the 2000s thanks to the rivalry between prominent dual-threat quarterbacks Donovan McNabb and Michael Vick. Recently, the Eagles' path to winning Super Bowl LII included a 2017 divisional round victory over the Falcons.

Players

Current roster

Awards and honors

Retired numbers

Notes:
 (*) Posthumous honors.
 Despite not being retired, the Eagles have not issued out Randall Cunningham's No. 12 since he left the Eagles in 1995, LeSean McCoy's No. 25 since he left the team in 2015, Brent Celek's No. 87 since he left the team in 2018, or Nick Foles' No. 9 since he left the team in 2019.

Pro Football Hall of Famers

Eagles Hall of Fame

In 1987, the Eagles Honor Roll was established. Every Eagles player who had been elected into the Pro Football Hall of Fame at that point was among the inaugural induction class. By 2012, the Honor Roll had been retitled as the Eagles Hall of Fame. Players are considered for induction three years after their retirement from the NFL, and there have been 47 inductees into the Eagles Hall of Fame as of 2019.

75th Anniversary Team

Franchise records
Source:pro-football-reference.com Eagles Franchise Page

Passing

+ = min. 500 attempts, # = min. 100 attempts, ∗ = minimum 15 attempts,

Rushing

∗ = minimum 15 attempts, # = min. 100 attempts, + = min. 500 attempts

Receiving

∗ = minimum 4 receptions, # = min. 20 receptions, + = min. 200 receptions

Other

Returning

Defense

Exceptional performances

Staff

Current staff

Radio and television

Eagles radio affiliates

Pennsylvania

Delaware

New Jersey

From 2008 through 2010, Eagles games were broadcast on both rock-formatted WYSP and sports-talk Sports Radio 610 WIP, as both stations were owned and operated by CBS Radio. In 2011, CBS dropped the music on WYSP, renaming it WIP-FM and making it a full simulcast of WIP. By 2020, 610 WIP had changed call letters to WTEL and rebranded to the Philadelphia affiliate for the Black Information Network, while WIP-FM broadcast all Eagles games. In 2017, the Eagles extended their broadcasting contract with WIP-FM through 2024.

Merrill Reese, who joined the Eagles in 1976, is the play-by-play announcer, and former Eagles wide receiver Mike Quick, who replaced offense lineman Stan Walters beginning in 1998, is the color analyst. The post-game show, which has consisted of many Philadelphia sports personalities, as of the 2014 season is hosted by Kevin Riley, a former Eagles linebacker and special-teamer, and Rob Ellis. Riley was the former post-game host for the show on 94 WYSP before the WIP change over; Rob Ellis hosts a weekly show nightly from 6–10 on 94.1 WIP-FM.

Spanish language broadcasts are on WEMG Mega 105.7FM with Rickie Ricardo on play-by-play, and Oscar Budejen as color commentator.

In 2015, the preseason games were being televised on WCAU, the local NBC owned and operated station.

During the regular season, games are governed by the NFL's master broadcasting contract with Fox, CBS, NBC, and ESPN. Most games can be seen on Fox-owned WTXF-TV. When hosting an AFC team, those games can be seen on CBS-owned KYW-TV.

Training camp

The Eagles previously held their preseason training camp from the end of July through mid-August each year at Lehigh University in Bethlehem in the Lehigh Valley. In 2013, with the addition of head coach Chip Kelly, the Eagles moved their training camp to the NovaCare Complex in Philadelphia. Training camps were previously held at Chestnut Hill Academy in 1935, Saint Joseph's University in 1939 and 1943, Saranac Lake from 1946 to 1948, Hershey from 1951 to 1967, Albright College from 1968 to 1972, Widener University from 1973 to 1979, and West Chester University from 1980 to 1995.

Fight song

This fight song is heard during Eagles' home games after touchdowns and before the team is introduced prior to kickoff.

Eagles' cheerleaders

The Eagles have their own cheerleading squad, which performs a variety of dance routines for the fans and the Eagles on the sideline. The squad also releases a swimsuit calendar each year, and is the first squad in the league to release the calendar on the Android and iOS mobile systems.

Fans

Devotion
Although the method may vary, studies that attempt to rank the 32 fan bases in the NFL consistently place Eagles fans among the best in the league, noting their "unmatched fervor." Eagles fans have numerous dedicated web communities, ranking the Eagles just The American City Business Journals, which conducts a regular study to determine the most loyal fans in the NFL, evaluates fans based primarily on attendance-related factors, and ranked Eagles fans third in both 1999 and 2006. The 2006 study called the fans "incredibly loyal", noting that they filled 99.8% of the seats in the stadium over the previous decade. Forbes placed the Eagles fans first in its 2008 survey, which was based on the correlation between team performance and fan attendance. ESPN.com placed Eagles fans fourth in the league in its 2008 survey, citing the connection between the team's performance and the mood of the city. The last home game that was blacked out on television in the Philadelphia market as a result of not being sold out was against the Arizona Cardinals on Sunday, September 12, 1999, which was Andy Reid's first home game as new head coach of the Eagles.

The studies note that—win or lose—Eagles fans can be counted on to pack their stadium. As of August 2008, the team had sold out 71 consecutive games, and 70,000 were on the team's waiting list for season tickets. Despite finishing with a 6–10 record in the 2005 season, the Eagles ranked second in the NFL in merchandise sales, and single-game tickets for the next season were sold out minutes after phone and Internet lines opened.

Eagles fans have also been known to chant the famous, "E-A-G-L-E-S – Eagles!" at Flyers, Phillies, and 76ers games when the team is getting blown out late in a game and a loss is inevitable, signifying their displeasure with the given team's performance, and that they are instead putting their hope into the Eagles.

Notable famous fans of the Eagles include actor Bradley Cooper, actor and comedian Kevin Hart, Jeopardy! champion Brad Rutter, journalists Jake Tapper and Jesse Watters, morning talk show host Kelly Ripa, TV personality Jim Cramer, and soccer star Carli Lloyd; the latter of whom also appeared at a joint practice of the Eagles with the Baltimore Ravens in 2019 where she nailed a 55-yard field goal attempt. One week later, during an international friendly pitting the United States against Portugal at Lincoln Financial Field, Lloyd celebrated scoring a goal by doing the “E-A-G-L-E-S, Eagles!” chant. The United States ultimately won that match 4–0.

Bad behavior
Along with their fierce devotion, Eagles fans have a reputation for bad behavior and sports-related violence, especially when the team plays its rivals. In If Football's a Religion, Why Don't We Have a Prayer?, Jereé Longman described the fans of the 700 Level of Veterans Stadium as having a reputation for "hostile taunting, fighting, public urination and general strangeness." So many incidents occurred at a 1997 game against the 49ers that at the following home game, Judge Seamus McCaffery began presiding over a temporary courtroom at the stadium; 20 suspects came before him that day. Fan behavior improved after the team's move to Lincoln Financial Field, and "Eagles Court" ended in December 2003.

In popular culture

The 1976 draw was the subject of the movie Invincible. The movie stars Mark Wahlberg as Vince Papale, a part-time school teacher, and also a diehard Eagles fan who became an Eagles player. The film differs slightly from true events as the selection process was invitation-only, and Papale had at least some previous playing experience. The film Silver Linings Playbook highlights the 2008 Philadelphia Eagles season, and the novel mentions the 2006 team. The film was critically acclaimed and nominated for several awards including 8 Academy Awards.

In the 1978 Academy Award-winning movie The Deer Hunter, the Eagles are referenced when Nick talks to Stan in the bar, saying: "Hey, I got a hundred bucks says the Eagles never cross the fifty in the next half and Oakland wins by 20!" Stan responds; "And I got an extra twenty says the Eagles' quarterback wears a dress!"

The award-winning comedy series It's Always Sunny in Philadelphia makes several references to the Philadelphia Eagles, most notably Season 3, Episode 2 – "The Gang Gets Invincible," the title being a reference to the Wahlberg film.

See also
 List of Philadelphia Eagles seasons
 South Philadelphia Sports Complex
 Sports in Philadelphia
 Forbes' list of the most valuable sports teams

Notes

References

Sources
 Lyons, Robert S. (2010). On Any Given Sunday: A Life of Bert Bell. Philadelphia: Temple University Press. . .

External links

 
 Philadelphia Eagles at the National Football League official website

 
National Football League teams
Culture of Philadelphia
Steagles
Sports in Philadelphia
American football teams established in 1933
1933 establishments in Pennsylvania